The Grega GN-1 Aircamper was a light aircraft developed in the United States in the early 1960s, originally as a personal project of its designer, but later marketed in plans form for homebuilding. John W. Grega initially set out to create a modernised version of the Pietenpol Air Camper using structural components from a Piper Cub but incorporating them into a new fuselage design based on the Pietenpol original. Two wings were designed, one based on the Cub wing, and another as a modernised version of the Pietenpol wing.

Specifications (GN-1)

See also

References

 
 

1960s United States sport aircraft
Homebuilt aircraft
High-wing aircraft
Single-engined tractor aircraft
Aircraft first flown in 1963